Bouyer is a surname, and may refer to:

 Franck Bouyer (born 1974), French professional bicycle racer
 Jean G. Bouyer (1891-1926), French World War I flying ace
 Louis Bouyer (1913-2004), French Lutheran minister and scholar
 Marcel Bouyer (1920–2000), French politician
 Mathieu Bouyer (born 1987), French professional football player
 Mitch Bouyer (1837-1876), interpreter and guide for General Custer
 Patricia Bouyer-Decitre (born 1976), French computer scientist
 Reynold Gideon Bouyer (1741-1826), archdeacon of Northumberland